Ruther Glen is an unincorporated community in Caroline County, Virginia, located near the interchange between Interstate 95 and Virginia State Highway 207, at  (37.938782, -77.471466).  The ZIP Code for Ruther Glen is 22546

Mattaponi Springs golf course is located in the community. Numerous telemarketing organizations use phone number masking techniques to make "Ruther Glen, Virginia" appear on prospects' caller ID units.

Politician Julian M. Quarles was born near the community.

Caroline County's only private Christian school, The Carmel School, is located in Ruther Glen. 

It was a stop on the Richmond, Fredericksburg and Potomac Railroad in the nineteenth century; this was replaced by CSXT. The Jericho School was listed on the National Register of Historic Places in 2004.

References

External links 

Caroline County, Virginia website

Unincorporated communities in Caroline County, Virginia
Unincorporated communities in Virginia